Michael Fellman (1943, Madison, Wisconsin – June 11, 2012, Vancouver, British Columbia) was a professor emeritus of history at 
Simon Fraser University in Vancouver, British Columbia, Canada.

Fellman was born in Madison, Wisconsin. He was educated at the University of Michigan (BA, 1965) and Northwestern University (PhD, 1969). He was the son of David Fellman, Vilas Professor Emeritus at the University of Wisconsin, Madison.

Bibliography
The Unbounded Frame:  Freedom and Community in Nineteenth-Century American Utopianism Greenwood, 1973    
Inside War: The Guerilla Conflict in Missouri During the American Civil War Oxford University Press, 1990  
Citizen Sherman: A Life of William Tecumseh Sherman Random House, 1995 
The Making of Robert E. Lee Random House, 2000  
In the Name of God and Country: Reconsidering Terrorism in American History Yale University Press, 2009  
Views from the Dark Side  of American History Louisiana State University Press, 2011

References

External links
 goodreads Books by Michael Fellman

1943 births
2012 deaths
Writers from Madison, Wisconsin
University of Michigan College of Literature, Science, and the Arts alumni
Northwestern University alumni
20th-century Canadian historians
Academic staff of Simon Fraser University
21st-century Canadian historians